was a previous Japanese football player who played for the Japan national team.

Club career
Noritake was born on July 18, 1922. After graduating from Kobe University of Economics, he played for Nippon Yusen. He also played for All Keio and won 1952 Emperor's Cup.

National team career
In March 1951, Noritake was selected Japan national team for Japan team first game after World War II, 1951 Asian Games. At this competition, on March 9, he debuted against Afghanistan.

Noritake died on March 6, 1994, at the age of 71.

National team statistics

Honours
Japan
Asian Games Bronze medal: 1951

References

External links
 
 Japan National Football Team Database

1922 births
1994 deaths
Kobe University alumni
Japanese footballers
Japan international footballers
Asian Games medalists in football
Asian Games bronze medalists for Japan
Footballers at the 1951 Asian Games
Medalists at the 1951 Asian Games
Association football forwards